The Daria-i-Noor, also spelled Darya-ye Noor, is one of the largest cut diamonds in the world, weighing an estimated 182 carats (36 g). Its colour, pale pink, is one of the rarest to be found in diamonds. The diamond is currently in the Iranian Crown Jewels collection of the Central Bank of Iran in Tehran.

Dimensions 
It is the world's largest known pink diamond.

History
This diamond, as it is also presumed for the Koh-i-Noor, was mined in Kollur mine in Andhra Pradesh, India. It was originally owned by the Kakatiya dynasty, later it was possessed by the Khalji dynasty of the Delhi Sultanate and to Mughal emperors. It was part of Shah Jahan's Peacock Throne.
	
In 1739, Nader Shah of Iran invaded Northern India, occupied Delhi. As payment for returning the crown of India to the Mughal emperor, Muhammad Shah, he took possession of the entire fabled treasury of the Mughals,  including the Daria-i-Noor, in addition to the Koh-i-Noor and the Peacock Throne.

After Nader Shah's death in 1747, the diamond was inherited by his grandson, Shahrokh Mirza. From there, it fell into the hands of the Lotf Ali Khan. After Lotf Ali Khan's defeat at the hands of Mohammad Khan Qajar, who established the ruling Qajar dynasty of Iran, the Daria-i-Noor entered the Qajar treasury. During this time, Naser al-Din Shah Qajar was said to be very fond of the diamond, often wearing it as an armband, aigrette, or a brooch and maintenance of the diamond was an honor bestowed upon higher ranking individuals.

Possible association

In 1965, a Canadian team conducting research on the Iranian Crown Jewels concluded that the Daria-i-Noor may well have been part of a large pink diamond that had been studded in the throne of the Mughal emperor Shah Jahan, and had been described in the journal of the French jeweller Jean-Baptiste Tavernier in 1642, who called it the Great Table diamond ("Diamanta Grande Table"). This diamond may have been cut into two pieces; the larger part is the Daria-i-Noor; the smaller part is believed to be the  Noor-ul-Ain diamond, presently studded in a tiara also in the Iranian Imperial collection.

See also
 Elizabeth II's jewels
 Golconda Diamonds
 Great Table diamond
 Koh-i-Noor diamond
 Noor-ul-Ain
 List of diamonds
 List of largest rough diamonds

References

External links
Treasury of National Jewels of Iran 

Iranian National Jewels
Jewels of the Mughal Empire
Individual diamonds
Pink diamonds
Golconda diamonds
Dhaka Nawab family
Wars involving Afsharid Iran